International tourism advertising is tourism-related marketing on the part of a private or public entity directed towards audiences abroad, and might target potential travelers and non-travelers alike.  Wholly private firms such as travel agencies, hotel chains, cruise agencies, non-governmental organizations (NGOs) often run their own advertising campaigns to market their existence, mission, or services and/or goods offered to the consumer, and these advertisements seldom carry intentional political messages.

On the other hand, advertising distributed by governments themselves, such as through tourism ministries or government-owned private sector enterprises, is sometimes intended to convey more than simply the value of the product, service, or experience; governments can use tourism ads as a channel for communicating directly to the public of other countries because tourism is a common and internationally encouraged industry and the advertising of it is subject to minimal content regulation.

As the global travel market continues to expand with yearly increasing flights among international destinations, advertising efforts on the part of the major actors in this market are also increasing. Advertising campaigns to promote travel to destinations abroad are particularly prevalent in western countries where the general public's expenditures on tourism tend to be consistently high, even in light of the economic recession.

Many advertisers, which include both private entities and foreign governments themselves, share the intended goal of increasing their own revenue by popularizing their service (e.g., airline or hotel chain) or destination to boost receipts from travelers; however, some travel campaigns have additional or alternative purposes, such as promoting good public sentiments or improving existing ones towards them among the target audience.  Sometimes, states may use the branding of a product or service, itself, as a means of conveying a specific message without explicitly stating the message; this tactic is often used to soften the implied message itself, thus allowing the brander to sidestep or minimize controversy and/or opposition.

Types
Tourism advertising can take many forms, utilize a wide array of advertising tactics, and be driven by a scope of private or public intents. Destination advertising is designed to make a location itself seem more appealing, while travel services advertising seeks to gain an audience's buy-in for the tourism-related service or product. Below are some instances of international tourism advertising overlapping with states' political, economic, and/or social interests.

Destination advertising
A great degree of ads promoting foreign countries are produced and distributed by the tourism ministries of those countries, so these ads often serve as vehicles for political statements and/or depictions of the destination country's desired foreign public perception(s).  Following are only a few of the many examples of government-produced tourism destination advertising that also serve political or social functions.

Bahamas
The Bahamas are commonly considered to be a focal point of leisure and recreational travel in the Caribbean and the island nation advertises itself as such.  Television ads and website produced by the government of the Bahamas specifically foster the image of the islands providing a care-free, exciting, culturally rich, and even romantic experience for travelers; a recent slogan for the marketing campaign was "It's better in the Bahamas" to reinforce the contrast between the desired perception as a low-stress getaway and the hectic nature of whatever living environment tourists would be leaving behind.  The Bahamas have, however, actually traditionally seen high violent crime rates, so the tourism marketing attempts to focus the audience's attention on the azure water and beaches and draw it away from any negative elements of life there.  Managing perceptions is a common part of advertising of many consumer products and services, focusing the audience's mind solely on the desirable aspects of whatever is being sold and away from any possible drawbacks or consequences.

India
The common impression of India in the West has long been either negative—including perceptions of widespread poverty, lack of sophisticated hygiene, and violent ethnic and religious clashes—or ambivalent, so the Indian government's Ministry of Tourism began a marketing campaign, "Incredible !ndia," to emphasize the country's rich culture, historic sites, tourist attractions, and general sense of excitement and dynamism to western audiences.  Tourism is an extremely lucrative and growing global industry so it is no surprise that India, a developing nation, is striving to capitalize on that market to boost its economy.  In addition, India is also looking to strengthen its international security and diplomatic ties while broadening and deepening its trade relationships, especially with the U.S., so it is in India's interest to promote a positive light for itself among the American and western voting populations in order to garner future international support and aid.

Kazakhstan
After the 2006 release of the Sacha Baron Cohen comedy Borat, which depicts a politically incorrect and socially oblivious fictional Kazakhi reporter who travels throughout the United States interviewing and meeting Americans from various walks of life, the government of Kazakhstan was highly offended by the depiction of its less than two-decade-old country and criticized the film and its creator as being defamatory and slanderous.  The issue of preserving Kazakhstan's public image in light of the movie was of such high importance that Kazakh President Nursultan Nazarbayev had it listed as a main issue when he traveled to the U.S. in September 2006 to meet with then-President George W. Bush.  Coupled with Nazarbeyev's visit, according to Kazakhstan embassy spokesman Roman Vassilenko, the Kazakh government staged a large-scale public relations "blitz," including "running four-page ads in The New York Times and U.S. News and World Report and commercials on CNN and the local ABC affiliate in Washington, D.C.", as well as launching TV ads to promote tourism to Kazakhstan.  These travel ads specifically featured cultural and historical features of the country as well as views of its developed infrastructure, specifically to counter the type of impression given by the Borat character to the West that Kazakhstan is socially and physically underdeveloped.

Mexico
Recently in 2010 the Tourism Board of Mexico, a public office that aggregates the resources and interests of the federal, state, and municipal governments, launched a tourism advertising campaign in the United States and Canada—Mexico's two North American Free Trade Agreement (NAFTA) partners—geared towards renovating common public political and social perceptions of Mexico, including impressions of poverty, government and law enforcement corruption, petty and organized crime and drug trading, and illegal immigration into the U.S.; the new campaign's purpose is expressly demonstrated by its marketing slogan, "Mexico, the place you thought you knew."  The print and television ads feature views of Mexico's beaches, natural wonders, cultural festivities, and historical artifacts like Mayan pyramids and Spanish churches in order to provide a counterbalance to the less preferable popular preconceptions.  The Tourism Board's stated goal of the advertising surge is to "generat[e] more than three [positive] impressions per person" among the North American audience.  The eventual goal is likely to increase tourism revenue for the country, but, for now, the Tourism Board is focusing on managing perceptions among the general populations of Mexico's two major neighboring trade partners.

Destination slogans

Many countries use slogans in their international tourism advertising. Destination slogans aim to promote a positive identity for the country. Academic studies of these slogans have identified several common themes such as the physical beauty of the location or the positive experiences travellers can expect to have there.

Travel services advertising

Additionally, a wide range of foreign airlines and travel-related services which also advertise separately from the destinations, themselves, are owned by their respective governments, such as the Emirates airline (Dubai), Qatar Airways (Qatar), China Airlines (Taiwan/Republic of China), and Air China (People's Republic of China).

China Airlines and Air China
China Airlines is the official flag carrier airline of Taiwan.  The Taiwanese government refers to its state as the Republic of China and considers itself to be the legitimate, non-Communist leadership-in-exile of all of China since the Communist overthrow in the mid-1950s.  The name of the airline carries the message of the long-lasting and ongoing cultural and political conflict between Communist "mainland" China (PRC) and Taiwan, that the Republic of China is the "true" China and that the state commonly referred to as "China" is illegitimate and usurped control of the country from the rightful leadership.  Similarly, the PRC counters this message by having named one of its largest international carriers "Air China" to reinforce the PRC's claim to be the legitimate of the "two Chinas."  The implicit conflict between the two states is likely lost on the majority of the general public outside the immediate region, such as the United States and Europe, but the strategic use of using advertising and targeting the international community through tourism is apparent on both sides.

Emirates
Through advertising for the Emirates airline, one of the major themes that Dubai promotes is its evolving status as a geographic and economic player in the Middle East.  Emirates advertising describes Dubai as "the perfect hub for an expanding global network" and illustrates this claim in the airline's "Centre of the World" television ad.  On the other hand, Dubai subtly promotes an official stance of multinationalism and a stated intent to cater to the comfort of travelers from abroad in the Emirates' "Multinational Cabin Crew" television ad.  These positions, among others, are portrayed via visually and audibly appealing commercials which are designed to relate to the target audience(s) and make the ads' messages maximally amenable to global viewers.  Emirates additionally adds to its effort to appeal to the West through its sponsorship of the Arsenal Football Club, including constructing the team's new venue, Emirates Stadium, which opened in July 2006 and prominently displays the Emirates branding on the exterior; in this way, any depictions of the stadium will result in de facto advertising and reinforce the public recognition of the Emirates company as one that is associated with western sports and culture. In May 2013 three Arsenal players, Kieran Gibbs, Alex Oxlade-Chamberlain and Carl Jenkinson took an A380 flight simulator challenge. Swapping their usual airline passenger seats and stepping into the cockpit, the players attempted to land an A380 in Dubai.

Emirates, along with the aviation services company Dnata, is owned by the parent company The Emirates Group which, in turn, is wholly owned by the Government of Dubai.  The chairman and CEO of The Emirates Group, Sheikh Ahmed Bin Saeed Al Maktoum, is the younger brother of the former ruler of Dubai, Sheikh Rashid Bin Saeed Al Maktoum, and uncle of the current ruler, Sheikh Mohammed Bin Rashid Al Maktoum.  In 1985, Sheikh Ahmed was appointed President of the Dubai Department of Civil Aviation (DCA), the governing body for airline regulation and airport control and operation.  The DCA was restructured and expanded in 2007, thus creating the Dubai Civil Aviation Authority (DCAA) which has since been the airline regulatory authority in the Emirate and the Dubai Airports company which owns and operates Dubai's airports, Dubai International and the currently under-construction Dubai World Central – Al Maktoum International.  Dubai International (IATA: DXB) is a primary international hub in the Middle East, offering flights to every continent except Antarctica.  As of November 2010, DXB is the 6th busiest airport in the world for cargo traffic, and the 14th highest passenger throughput of all international airports.

Sheikh Ahmed currently simultaneously holds the positions of Chairman and CEO of Emirates Airline & Group, which includes the Emirates airline and Dnata air services company, Chairman of the Dubai Airports company, and President of the Dubai Civil Aviation Authority.  Because Dubai's government leadership is directly involved and intertwined with private-sector enterprises, including the Emirates airline and many other facets of the tourism industry, the government there necessarily has a vested interest in the public perception of Dubai.

References

External links 
 Forbes: "Emirates Air: Spoiling for a Fight"
 World Economic Forum's "The Travel & Tourism Competitiveness Report 2009

Advertising
Tourism campaigns